Flaum is a surname. Notable people with the surname include:

Joel Flaum (born 1936), American judge
Marshall Flaum (1925–2010), American television director, producer, and screenwriter
Thea Flaum (born 1938), American television producer

See also
Flam (surname)